Elaine Sciolino is an author and contributing writer of The New York Times, writing from France since 2002.

She grew up near Buffalo (NY) and began her career as a journalist with Newsweek magazine. In 1984 she joined the New York Times.

Bibliography
 The Outlaw State: Saddam Hussein’s Quest for Power and the Gulf Crisis. New York: John Wiley & Sons, 1991. (hardcover) ASIN: B000AO4E3U (trade paperback)  . A Book-of-the-Month Club selection.
 Persian Mirrors: The Elusive Face of Iran. New York: The Free Press, 2000. (Reissued edition, 2005)  
 La Séduction: How the French Play the Game of Life. New York: Times Books, 2011. , 
 The Only Street in Paris: Life on the Rue des Martyrs. New York: W.W. Norton & Company, 2015. , 
 La Dernière Rue de Paris : Enquête sur la rue des Martyrs. Exils, 2016. 
 The Seine : the River that made Paris W.W. Norton & Company, 2019.

Notes

External links

https://elainesciolino.com/about
NPR
Weekend Edition interview with Sciolino on the French reaction to the Strauss-Kahn verdict, June 13, 2013.

Year of birth missing (living people)
Writers from Buffalo, New York
Living people
Canisius College alumni
New York University alumni
American people of Italian descent
The New York Times writers
American women journalists